Sudipa Basu is a Bengali film and television actress.

Filmography 
 Trishna (2009)
 Notobor Notout (2010)
 Hing Ting Chhat (2010)
 Punorutthan (2011)
 Raja Gaja No Problem (2011)
 Faande Poriya Boga Kaande Re (2011)
 Bye Bye Bangkok (2011)
 Abar Byomkesh (2012)
 Balukabela.com(2012)
 Golemale Pirit Koro Na (2013)
 Bakita Byaktigato(2013)
 Mahalaya_(film) (2019)

Television 
Ek Akasher Niche as Anita (later replaced by Indrani Basu) then again Sudipa come back in this role
Ekdin Pratidin as Sudipa
Phirki as Meenakshi
Durga
Raja & Gaja
Shashuri Zindabad
Tapur Tupur as Gayatree Choudhury 
Boyei Gelo as Sucharita Das 
Mon Niye Kachakachi as Mona Kaapor 
Jarowar Jhumko as Bhalo Bou
Khelaghor as Aloka Chatterjee
Boron
Jibon Saathi as Konika
Bodhisattwor Bodhbuddhi 
Jagaddhatri

See also 
 Chaiti Ghoshal
 Kamalika Banerjee

References

External links 
 

Living people
Actresses in Bengali cinema
Indian film actresses
21st-century Indian actresses
Year of birth missing (living people)